Bokhtar, previously known as Qurghonteppa or Kurganteppa, is a city in southwestern Tajikistan, which serves as the capital of the Khatlon region.

Population 
It is estimated that the population of the city is close to 110,800 (est. 2019) people, making it the third-largest city in the country. The population fluctuates depending on season (due to Tajik emigrant workers in Russia).

Along with the capital Dushanbe, Bokhtar is demographically much more diverse than other major Tajik cities such as Khujand, Kulob or Istaravshan. Ethnicities include Tajiks, Uzbeks, Russians, Pashtuns, Tatars, Ukrainians, Kazakhs, Greeks and many more. The city had a large number of ethnic Russians who were actively employed by the industrial and agricultural complexes in and around the city.

The political opposition in Tajikistan primarily comes from Bokhtar.

Overview 
Bokhtar, then Qurghonteppa, became the epicenter of conflict by the summer of 1992 and was seriously damaged during the civil war. Many of the local Kulobi and Uzbeks were forced to flee in 1992 following advances and attacks from the pro-opposition Gharmi forces.

12 km east of the Tube, there stands a hill called Ajina tepe with a 12-metre-length image of Buddha in Nirvana, including remnants of a Buddhist Monastery from the 7th - 8th cent.

Bokhtar International Airport serves a handful of cities in Tajikistan, Russia and Kazakhstan. The city is considered to be the heart of cotton ("white gold") cultivation in Tajikistan.

Bokhtar and Kulob are the main cities of south Tajikistan. Bokhtar is a regional hub (one of the top four), especially for banking and telecommunications industries.

The city was officially renamed on January 22, 2018 to "Bokhtar".

Tajik emigrant workers (mostly employed in Russia) have significantly contributed to the local economy since early 2000s.

Climate 
Bokhtar has a semi-arid climate (Köppen climate classification BSk), with cool winters and very hot summers. Precipitation is quite low, and peaks in spring, while summers are very dry.

Notable people 
Sergei Mandreko (1971-2022) - football coach
Nurudin N. Mukhitdinov (1959-) - politician

Trivia 
Finnish electronic duo Pan Sonic have a track entitled "Radio Qurghonteppa" on their 2010 farewell album Gravitoni.

See also 
 List of cities in Tajikistan
 FC Khatlon football club
 Buddhistic cloister of Ajina-Tepa

References

External links 

 Kurgan Tepe in Encyclopaedia Iranica Online

Populated places in Khatlon Region